Jakub Nosek (born 30 October 1989) is a Czech deaf bobsledder who has formerly competed as a track and field athlete. He competed in the two-man event at the 2018 Winter Olympics. Prior to his Olympic debut during the 2018 Winter Olympics, he has competed in Deaflympics as a track and field athlete as he has represented the Czech Republic at the Deaflympics in 2009, 2013 and 2017.

Biography
Jakub Nosek became deaf after contracting meningitis when he was just three years old. He lost about 99 percent of the hearing in his right ear and 80 percent in his left ear. He graduated from the Charles University, which is situated in Prague. Jakub has participated at the Summer Deaflympics on three occasions and has competed in the high jump, long jump, decathlon and javelin throw events.

See also
Deaf people in the Olympics

References

1989 births
Living people
Czech male bobsledders
Czech male high jumpers
Czech male javelin throwers
Czech male long jumpers
Deaf sportspeople
Olympic bobsledders of the Czech Republic
Bobsledders at the 2018 Winter Olympics
Bobsledders at the 2022 Winter Olympics
Czech deaf people
Sportspeople from Ústí nad Labem
Charles University alumni